The Vows is a 1973 Portuguese drama film directed by António de Macedo. It was entered into the 1973 Cannes Film Festival.

Synopsis 
Maria do Mar and her husband, José, are young newlyweds living in a fishing village, Palheiros de Tocha, between Aveiro and Figueira da Foz. Their intimacy is disturbed, however, by a vow of chastity they took as a result of a storm that caused the shipwreck of José's father's boat. Both live in permanent tension, caused by the presence of Labareda, a gypsy taken in by the couple following a dispute in which he was stabbed.

Cast
 Guida Maria - Maria do Mar
 Sinde Filipe - Labareda
 João Mota - José
 Luís Santos - Salvador
 J. Rodrigues de Carvalho - Mário
 Fernando Loureiro - Gypsy
 Luís Barradas - Gypsy
 Fernanda Coimbra - Gypsy
 Maria - Joaquina
 Grece de Castro - Grandmother
 Xico Machado - Father João
 Agostinho Alves - Father Couto
 Celeste Alves - Maria's neighbour

References

External links

1973 films
1970s Portuguese-language films
1973 drama films
Films directed by António de Macedo
Portuguese drama films